Radoševo is a village in the municipality of Arilje, Serbia. According to the 2011 census, the village has a population of 286 people.

References

Populated places in Zlatibor District